Pharaon (and its variant Pharaoun) is a surname and a masculine given name. People with the name are as follows:

Surname

Ghaith Pharaon (1940–2017), Saudi Arabian businessman
Laith Pharaon (born 1968), British businessman
Michel Pharaon (born 1959), Lebanese politician
Henri Philippe Pharaoun (1901–1993), Lebanese politician, and businessman
Rashad Pharaon (1912–1990), Syrian-born Saudi Arabian statesman and physician

Given name
Pharaon Mirzoyan (born 1949), Armenian painter
Pharaon de Winter (1849–1924), French painter

Masculine given names
Surnames of Lebanese origin
Surnames of Syrian origin